Ruzbihan Baqli: Mysticism and the Rhetoric of Sainthood in Persian Sufism is a book-length study of Ruzbihan Baqli by Carl W. Ernst. The book was awarded the Farabi Award.

Reception
The book has been reviewed in the International Journal of Middle East Studies.
Leonard Lewisohn calls the book "of key importance to the study of Ruzbihan well into the next century."

References

External links 
 Ruzbihan Baqli: Mysticism and the Rhetoric of Sainthood in Persian Sufism
1996 non-fiction books
English-language books
Sufism